Marcel Gargar (July 19, 1911 in Guadeloupe December 24, 2004) was a politician from Guadeloupe who was elected to the French Senate in 1968 .

References 
 page on the French Senate website
Obituary Notice

Guadeloupean politicians
French people of Guadeloupean descent
French Senators of the Fifth Republic
1911 births
2004 deaths
Senators of Guadeloupe